The following is a list of film and television podcasts.

List

References 

Lists of podcasts
Film and television podcasts
Film-related lists
Television lists